Baby Blue (Japanese: ベイビーブルー, romanized: Beibīburū; stylized as BABY BLUE) is a Filipino girl group and a sub-unit of the all-female Filipino idol group MNL48. They debuted with their lead single "Sweet Talking Sugar" in September 2020, which topped in Egg Music charts in Japan and made them one of the few Filipino artists to make it to Japanese music charts.

History

2020: Formation 
On September 1, together with a major Japanese music label Tower Records Japan, Hallo-hallo Entertainment announced the formation of the successful P-Pop girl group, MNL48's first-ever sub-unit BABY BLUE. The said sub-unit is composed of Jan Elaurza, Amy Isidto, and Coleen Trinidad.  Following the announcement, BABY BLUE officially released its debut single titled "Sweet Talking Sugar", and was made available through EGGS, a Japanese digital music subscription service. The single, according to HHE, is a homage to the famed city pop genre, with a modern take via "the R&B and hip-hop genre". On September 16, The official music video was released on GYAO!, and on MNL48's official YouTube channel, the next day. The MV was directed and produced by Carlo Francisco Manatad of Plan C Productions. 

A second track, "NEGASTAR" was released by the sub-unit officially after they uploaded a sixty-second teaser uploaded on the music subscription service EGGS on November 16. The full track was then uploaded on November 25 and was also made available on mainstream music streaming platforms like iTunes and Spotify.

2021-2022: "Stuck On You" 
BABY BLUE released teasers such as pre-saved posters and audio snippets for their third single in March 29, 2021. In April 21 of the same year BABY BLUE released their third digital single "Stuck On You". This song is finished in a straight love song with a stylish and pop beat and a light sound,  the pre-order of the song started on April 7. in May 28, 2021, The group launched their official fans club site where live videos, blogs, and other informations can only be seen there. Subsequently, on the same day, they also opened their official YouTube channel and showed  contents that can only be seen there, such as cover videos, songs, and dance covers of Japanese songs. 

in December 15, 2021, the group released their first major single, "Head Up." The track release marks the fourth single released by the group and their first ballad. It is also the group's major debut in Japan. "HEAD UP" was released in advance on December 15 and will be re-released on February 19, 2022.

On June 30, 2022, after her 4 years in the group, BABY BLUE's leader Jan Elaurza announced her graduation from MNL48, she also announced departure from the unit. On the same day, it was announced on the official website of BABY BLUE that Frances Pinlac of MNL48 Team L  will be replacing Jan.

Members

Current 

 Coleen Trinidad (MNL48 Team NIV)
 Amy Isidto (MNL48 Team L)
 Frances Pinlac (MNL48 Team L)

Former 

 Jan Elaurza (Left the group in June 2022)

Works

Singles

Music Videos

External links 

 BABY BLUE official site
 
 
 
 

Filipino girl groups